This is a list of amphibians and reptiles found on the island of Saba, a Dutch municipality in the Caribbean Lesser Antilles.

Amphibians
There is one species of amphibian on Saba.

Frogs (Anura)

Reptiles
Including marine turtles and introduced species, there are 11 reptile species reported on Saba.  One species, the Saban Anole (Anolis sabanus), is endemic to Saba.

Turtles (Testudines)

Lizards and snakes (Squamata)

Notes

References
Note: All species listed above are supported by Malhotra & Thorpe 1999, unless otherwise cited.

.

 Amphibians
Saba
Saba
 Saba
 Saba
Saba